Aromobates orostoma (common name: Tachira rocket frog) is a species of frog in the family Aromobatidae. It is endemic to Venezuela where it is only known from near its type locality, Boca de Monte in the Táchira state.
Its natural habitats are mountain streams in cloud forest. The male protects the eggs that are laid on land. After hatching, the male carries the tadpoles on its back to water where they develop further.

Aromobates duranti is threatened by habitat loss caused by agriculture, involving both crops and livestock, and agricultural pollution.

References

orostoma
Amphibians of Venezuela
Endemic fauna of Venezuela
Taxonomy articles created by Polbot
Amphibians described in 1978